is a Japanese actress, voice actress and singer from the Greater Tokyo Area. As a singer, she goes by the name em:óu. She attended Tokai University, but left due to lack of interest. She is best known for voicing Shinji Ikari in Neon Genesis Evangelion, Yugi Mutou and Dark Yugi in the Toei version of Yu-Gi-Oh!, Makoto Naegi and Nagito Komaeda in the Danganronpa series, Kurama in Yu Yu Hakusho, Sailor Uranus in the Sailor Moon series, Hanako and Tsukasa in Toilet-Bound Hanako-kun and Yukito Tsukishiro/Yue in Cardcaptor Sakura.

Biography
Ogata began working as a musical actress, attending the same classes alongside Rumi Kasahara and Shiho Niiyama. She used to be affiliated with Aoni Production. Because of her husky voice, she is often typecast as either young men and boys or tomboyish women (a famous example of this being Sailor Uranus, a popular character from Sailor Moon, known for being a charming tomboy in her civilian form). It is also because of this that she is sometimes referred as "Aniki" ("Big Brother" in Japanese, usually used in gangs) by fans. She married for the second time on April 1, 2004, and appeared with Ichirou Mizuki on NHK's second anime song marathon on April 30.

Filmography

Anime

OVA
1993
Ah My Goddess (Keiichi Morisato (child))

1994
Eizou Hakusho (Kurama)

1995
Armitage III (Julian Moore)
Miyuki-chan in Wonderland (Fuyuri, To Li)
Eizou Hakusho II (Kurama)
Kodomo no Omocha (Akito Hayama)
Glass Mask (Maya Kitajima)
Sorcerer Hunters (Mille feuille)
UFO Princess Valkyrie: SPECIAL – Bridal Training (Valkyrie)
Landlock (Agahari)

1996
Apocalypse Zero (Harara Hagakure)

1997
Rayearth (Emeraude)

1999
Melty Lancer: The Animation (Melvina MacGarlen)

2011
Fate/Prototype (Rider's Master)

2012
One Off (Kageyama)

2017
Super Danganronpa 2.5: Komaeda Nagito to Sekai no Hakaisha (Nagito Komaeda, Makoto Naegi)

Anime films
Yu Yu Hakusho: The Movie (1993) (Kurama)
Pretty Soldier Sailor Moon R: The Movie (1993) (Young Mamoru)
Yu Yu Hakusho: Chapter of Underworld's Carnage – Bonds of Fire (1994) (Kurama)
Pretty Soldier Sailor Moon S The Movie (1994) (Haruka Tenoh)
Pretty Soldier Sailor Moon Super S: The Nine Sailor Soldiers Unite! Miracle of the Black Dream Hole (1995) (Haruka Tenoh)
Neon Genesis Evangelion: Death & Rebirth (1997) (Shinji Ikari)
The End of Evangelion (1997) (Shinji Ikari)
Yu-Gi-Oh! (1999) (Yugi Mutou, Dark Yugi)
Cardcaptor Sakura: The Movie (1999) (Yukito Tsukishiro)
Cardcaptor Sakura Movie 2: The Sealed Card (2000) (Yue/Yukito Tsukishiro)
Case Closed: The Phantom of Baker Street (2002) (Hideki Moroboshi, Noaz Ark)
Black Jack: The Two Doctors of Darkness (2005) (Brother)
Evangelion: 1.0 You Are (Not) Alone (2007) (Shinji Ikari)
Evangelion: 2.0 You Can (Not) Advance (2009) (Shinji Ikari)
Evangelion: 3.0 You Can (Not) Redo (2012) (Shinji Ikari)
Persona 3 The Movie: No. 2, Midsummer Knight's Dream (2014) (Ken Amada)
Persona 3 The Movie: No. 3, Falling Down (2015) (Ken Amada)
Evangelion: 3.0+1.0 Thrice Upon a Time (2021) (Shinji Ikari)
Jujutsu Kaisen 0 (2021) (Yuta Okkotsu)
Digimon Adventure 02: The Beginning (TBA) (Rui Ōwada)

Video games
The Legend of Valkyrie Gaiden: The Adventure of Rosa (Michelle)	(1986)
Mega Man X (X)	(1993)
Twin Goddesses (Carmila)	(1994)
Pretty Soldier Sailor Moon: Another Story (Sailor Uranus)	(1995)
Battle Tycoon: Flash Hiders SFX (Pachet Vain)	(1995)
Magic Knight Rayearth (Emeraude)	(1995)
Battle Arena Toshinden 2 (Officer Tracy)	(1995)
Meltylancer: Ginga Shoujo Keisatsu 2086 (Melvina MACGARLEN)	(1996)
True Love Story (Shinobu Kusanagi)	(1996–2003)
YuYu Hakusho série (Kurama)	(1996– )
Last Bronx (Yoko Kono)	(1996)
Star Gladiator and Plasma Sword (June Lin Milliam)	(1996)
Tomb Raider (Lara Croft)	(1996)
Battle Arena Toshinden 3 (Officer Tracy)	(1996)
Neon Genesis Evangelion: Girlfriend of Steel (Shinji Ikari)	(1997)
Super Robot Wars F (Ring Mao, Shinji Ikari)	(1997)
Tengai Makyō: Daiyon no Mokushiroku (Seiya)	(1997)
Meltylancer Re-inforce (Melvina MACGARLEN)	(1997)
Twinbee RPG (Seeds)	(1998)
Super Robot Wars F Final (Ring Mao, Shinji Ikari)	(1998)
Street Fighter EX2 (1998) et EX3 (Nanase, Sharon) (2000)
Meltylancer: The 3rd Planet (Melvina MACGARLEN)	(1999)	
Super Robot Wars Alpha (Shinji Ikari)	(2000)
Xenosaga Episode I: Der Wille zur Macht (Luvedo)	(2002)
Mega Man Zero (Harpuia)	(2002)
Mega Man Zero 2 (Harpuia)	(2003)
Toshinden 2X PP (Tracy)	(2004)
Super Robot Wars MX (Shinji Ikari)	(2004)
Mega Man Zero 3 (Harpuia)	(2004)
Neon Genesis Evangelion: Girlfriend of Steel 2nd (Shinji Ikari)	(2005)
Super Robot Wars Alpha 3 (Shinji Ikari)	(2005)
Mega Man ZX (Biometal Model H)	(2006)
Persona 3 (Ken Amada)	(2006)
Super Robot Wars Original Generaions (Ring Mao)	(2007)
Tales of Vesperia (Ioder /Yodel)	(2008)
Maji de Watashi ni Koishinasai! (Cookie-1)	(2009)
Koi to Senkyo to Chocolate (Oboro Yumeshima)	(2010)
Danganronpa: Trigger Happy Havoc (Makoto Naegi) (2010)
Dengeki Stryker (Colonel Mirror)	(2012)
Danganronpa 2: Goodbye Despair (Nagito Komaeda, Makoto Naegi) (2012)
Phantasy Star Online 2 (Xion and Xiao) (2012)
Persona 4 Arena Ultimax (Ken Amada) (2013)
Super Robot Wars Z3.1 (Shinji Ikari)	(2014)
Princess Nightmare (Phantom) (2014)
Granblue Fantasy (Grimnir) (2014)
Persona Q: Shadow of the Labyrinth (Ken Amada)	(2014)
Danganronpa Another Episode: Ultra Despair Girls (Nagito Komaeda, "Servant", Makoto Naegi) (2014)
Aokana: Four Rhythm Across the Blue (Aoi Kagami) (2014)
Danganronpa V3: Killing Harmony (Makoto Naegi, Nagito Komaeda) (2017)
Super Robot Wars V (Shinji Ikari)	(2017)
Fighting EX Layer (Sanane)	(2018)
World's End Club (Pochi) (2020)
Live a Live (Pogo) (2022)

Tokusatsu
Gridman the Hyper Agent (1993) (Voice of Mateibea)
Mashin Sentai Kiramager the Movie: Be-Bop Dream (2021) (Voice of Dream Stone)

Other live-action
 Teen Regime (2022) (Voice of AI)

Dubbing

Live-action
Hackers (Kate "Acid Burn" Libby (Angelina Jolie))
Shazam! (Billy Batson (Asher Angel))
Shazam! Fury of the Gods (Billy Batson (Asher Angel))

Others

DRAMA CD
「Kasoke ☆ Yuu ☆ Hakusho」Series 「幽☆遊☆白書シリーズ」 (Zou-Ba) 
Rurou Ni Kenshin 〜 Meiji Kenkaku Roman Tan 「るろうに剣心〜明治剣客浪漫譚」 (Himura Kenshin) 
Tenba No Ketsuzoku 「天馬の血族」 (Aruto Jin) 
Time Leap 「タイム・リープ」 (Wakamatsu Kazuhiko) 
Hana No Asuka Gumi Gaiden 「花のあすか組！　外伝」 (Kuraku Asuka) 
「Dear」Series 「Dearシリーズ」 (Kisaki Sumeragi) 
Toki No Daichi 「刻の大地」 (Jendo) 
Tentai Gikai 「天体議会」 (Mizu Hasu) 
Shōnen Shinka-Ron 「少年進化論」 (Fujisaki Sana) 
Fushigi Yuuki 〜 Genbu Kaiden 「ふしぎ遊戯〜玄武開伝」 (Shitsu yado) 
Kaze No Oukoku 「風の王国」 (Ri Suiran) 
Gakuen Kaku Meiden Mitsurugi 「学園革命伝ミツルギ」 (Mitsurugi Chiruchiru) 
Ray Sweeper 「レイスイーパー」 (Ken Shin) 
Shiritsu Kurearu Gakuen 「私立クレアール学園」 (Hyōdō Takaiku) 
Ginga Tetsudou No Yoru 「銀河鉄道の夜」 (Tadashi) 
「Shuuen No Shiori」 Series 「終焉ノ栞」シリーズ」 (A-ya)
Ima, Ai Ni Yukimasu 「いま、会いにゆきます」 (Aio Yuuji) 
Radical Hospital 「ラディカル・ホスピタル」 (Yonezawa Amerika) 
Love Cuisine 〜 Monster Recipe 〜 「Love Cuisnie〜モンスターズ・レシピ〜」 (Rubinou & Koruri) 
Grand Stage 「グラン・ステージ」 (Akihiro Akito)
Fate/Prototype: Fragments of Sky Silver 「フェイト/プロトタイプ 蒼銀のフラグメンツ」(Moses)

Broadcast radio
Ogata Megumi no MUSIC COAST
Ogata Megumi no Ginga ni Hoero! (1996–1998)
Ogata Megumi no Ai daze!BABY!
Kyou wa Ichinichi Anison Zanmai S.S.

Internet radio show
Ogata Megumi no Himitsu no Ha・Na・Zo・N
Ogata vs Domon MOEMOEWoo!toko-gumi! (M.O.Bay)
Bara Iro Tengoku (M.O.Bay)
Megumi Ogata's Yell ROCK

Personal show
Love Letter
Ogata Megumi no Tsuki no Yoru ni Ai ma Show

Full CDs
Half Moon (March 16, 1994)
Marine Legend (April 21, 1995)
Winter Bird (December 13, 1995)
Multipheno (October 28, 1996)
Santa Claus ni Naritai (November 11, 1996)
Megumi Ogata Live: Multipheno Concert Tour 1996 Winter Concert (March 5, 1997)
MO (em:óu) (March 11, 1998)
Megumi Ogata Live: [em:óu] Concert Tour 1998 ((in Tokio to Hong Kong)) (March 13, 1999)
Best "Runner" (June 30, 1999)
Rain (2001/01/10)
Aitai. ~passed and next 1992-2002~ (2002/12/04)
STOP, AND GO (2003/07/02)
Kagami no kuni no alice (2004/10/22)
Yoake no Jikan (2006/07/05)
Animegu (2007/10/03)
LiveCD「Christmas Rose2007～acoustic live」 (2008/04/08)
666:rock・lock・ROCK! (2008/12/24)
Desire - Kibou (2013/11/23)
real / dummy (2017/2/1)
Animegu. 25th (2017/10/11)
Early Ogata Best (2018/5/30)
Gekiraku -Dramatic Medicine- (2021/4/21)

Singles
Tenki Ame ga Futta Hi (January 21, 1996)
Kaze no Bohyou (May 25, 1996)
Kizutsukanai ai wa iranai (July 10, 1996)
Wine Red no Kokoro (October 7, 1996)
Time Leap (May 25, 1997)
Jealousy no aza (December 17, 1997)
Vacation map (February 11, 1998)
Rasen (November 18, 1998)
Hikari Wo Sagashite
Run
Silver Rain (July 1, 1999)
Animal Eyes (August 22, 1999)
Ouchi wo Tsukuro (2001/12/29)
Kuchen backen und dabeinnocent Prisoner (2013/2/10)
Kuchen backen und dabe (2013/2/10)
Innocent prisoner (2013/2/10)
Kodoku no Kakurenbo (September 23, 2015 On sale)

Awards

References

External links
 

1965 births
20th-century Japanese actresses
20th-century Japanese women singers
20th-century Japanese singers
21st-century Japanese actresses
21st-century Japanese women singers
21st-century Japanese singers
Anime singers
Aoni Production voice actors
Living people
Japanese contraltos
Japanese YouTubers
Japanese singer-songwriters
Japanese musical theatre actresses
Japanese video game actresses
Japanese voice actresses
Japanese women pop singers
Japanese women rock singers
Japanese women singer-songwriters
People from Chiyoda, Tokyo
Seiyu Award winners
Singers from Tokyo
Tokai University alumni
Voice actresses from Tokyo